The International Jim Reeves is a 1963 album by Jim Reeves RCA Victor – LSP-2704. "Auf wiederseh'n Sweetheart" and "Blue Canadian Rockies" were released as singles.

Track listing
"Auf Wiederseh'n Sweetheart"	3:01
"The Old Kalahari"	2:07 “Die Ou Kalahari”
"(There'll Be Bluebirds Over) The White Cliffs of Dover"	2:57
"True"	2:31 song by Cindy Walker
"I'm Crying Again"	1:58 “Ek Verlang Na Jou”
"Guilty"	3:09
"Blue Canadian Rockies"	2:36
"The Hawaiian Wedding Song"	2:05
"You Are My Love"	1:39  “Jy Is My Liefling” (Jim Reeves - C Cooper - W Cooper), 
"Heartbreak in Silhouette"	3:04
"Tahiti"	2:26, Afrikaans song
"Golden Memories and Silver Tears"	2:47 Cindy Walker

References

Jim Reeves albums
1963 albums
Albums produced by Chet Atkins
RCA Victor albums